Niveas agassizi is a moth of the family Choreutidae. It is found in Kenya.

The forewings are bronze-brown with speckled white-tipped scales over most of the surface. There is a distinct dark brown to black band along the termen with two small white spots at the apex. The hindwings are light brown.

Etymology
The species is named in honour of David Agassiz, who collected all the known specimens and made many significant contributions to the knowledge of African micro-moths.

References

Moths described in 2013
Choreutidae